Marlon S. Kazadi (born Nov. 16, 2004) is a Canadian actor and music artist. He is known for the  role of “Taylor” in the Independent film Chained, (2020). This was Kazadi’s first lead role, in which he won “Best Young Actor” from the New York International Film Awards, and nominations for Best Actor for a Canadian Film at the Vancouver Film Critics Circle Awards. as well as Best Lead Performance, Male at the UBCP/ACTRA Awards.

Early life 
Marlon S. Kazadi moved to Vancouver, B.C. from the Democratic Republic of Congo, at the age of 7, with his mother, Fatou Kazadi; who later remarried music producer Kayvon Sarfehjooy (K-Salaam). Marlon Kazadi attended French speaking schools – Ecole Anne Hébert and Ecole des Pionniers, before continuing his education in English.

Career 
Kazadi made his first acting debut at 9 years old, on the ABC series The Whispers. He decided to respond to an open call after his Mother suggested that he may take a liking to acting, as she noticed his talent from him replaying movie characters that he watched as a child.  

Marlon then took a three-year hiatus from acting to pursue a career as a professional soccer player, which was his first dream. One day during his soccer training, Kazadi had an epiphany and realized that acting was his true calling. In 2018 he made his return to acting; where he landed the supporting role of Omar in the feature film Child's Play, a remake of the original classic horror film featuring the infamous Chucky doll. That same year, Kazadi was cast in two popular series: first as Young James (Jimmy) Olsen in Supergirl, and then in a recurring role as Malcolm in Riverdale. 

By the age of 15, Marlon landed his first lead role as Taylor in the feature film Chained, (2020) a crime thriller by Titus Heckel, in which Kazadi won, and was nominated for multiple awards based off of his performance.

His work in “Chained” caught the eyes of various producers, which eventually landed him another lead role, this time as Mike Broadstreet in “Zombie Town,” a zombie thriller directed by Peter Lepeniotis, based on author R.L. Stine’s book of the same name. The film will premiere in theatres in 2023.

References

External links

21st-century Canadian male actors
Canadian male child actors
Canadian male film actors
Canadian male television actors
Black Canadian male actors
Male actors from Vancouver
Living people
Year of birth missing (living people)